Yaqoob Bizenjo is a Pakistani politician who was a member of the National Assembly of Pakistan from 2008 to 2013. On May 30, 2009.

Political career
He was elected to the National Assembly of Pakistan from Constituency NA-272 (Kech-cum-Gwadar) as a candidate of Balochistan National Party Awami in 2008 Pakistani general election. He received 61,655 votes and defeated an independent candidate, Zubaida Jalal Khan.

References

Living people
Year of birth missing (living people)
Pakistani MNAs 2008–2013